Bottoni is a surname. Notable people with the surname include:

Alessandro Bottoni (born 1972), Italian triathlete
Christoph Bottoni (born 1977), Swiss sailor
Flaminio Bottoni (1881–?), Italian gymnast
Marco Antonio Bottoni, Italian Roman Catholic prelate 

Italian-language surnames